The Association for Equal and Fair Trade Pangaea (Spanish: Asociación para el Comercio Justo y Solidario Pangea) is a secular human development non-governmental organization best known for its work on fair trade and Food sovereignty.

It was founded in 1995 by a group of former volunteers looking for a new way to spread their views on fair trade, responsible consumption and social action in Santiago de Compostela and Galicia."

It is governed in a participative and democratic way by its members, who organized in commissions, vote and discuss its decisions. Apart from the general annual assembly, it has open and public weekly meetings in the head office."

Together with the activities of social education, social action and human development it also has a public open fair trade shop.

Pangaea is also an important member of: Galician Net of Conscious and Responsible Consumption (Spanish: Red de Consumo Consciente y Responsable), Initiative for Food Sovereignty (Spanish: Iniciativa por la Soberanía Alimentaria) and Space for a Fair Trade (Spanish: Espacio por un Comercio Justo)."

Pangaea won the 2006 Vagalume Prize in social work awarded by the municipality of Santiago de Compostela besides other minor awards and prizes."

Since 2010 Pangaea established itself as Consumer's Cooperative for Fair Trade and Biological Products, under the name of "Panxea S.C.G"

Work and Organization

The most important work of this association is in Fair Trade and biological products. The first way of achieving this is through its public open fair trade shop.

Goods are obtained through Fair Trade importers, which are the first responsibles of guaranteed the origin and Fair Trade Principles of these products.

Biological products are directly purchased to local farmers and producers, trying to fulfill proximity criteria and full respect of environmental standards.

The rest of the social education, works and lectures are given through the participation in forums, social acts and congresses.

See also
 Fair Trade
 Food sovereignty

References

External links
 PanxeaBlog 

Fair trade organizations
Non-profit organisations based in Spain